Nuno Miguel Prata Coelho (born 23 November 1987) is a Portuguese professional footballer who plays mainly as a defensive midfielder but also as a central defender.

Club career
Born in Covilhã, Coelho moved from hometown club S.C. Covilhã to FC Porto in 2005 to complete his formation although he had already appeared for the former's first team, and went on to serve three loans in the following three seasons, including two and a half years at second division side Portimonense SC, where he played alongside namesake Nuno André Coelho.

Coelho was again loaned by Porto in July 2009, moving to Villarreal CF in Spain. The deal eventually broke, however, and he stayed in Portugal by penning a two-year contract with Académica de Coimbra.

On 9 June 2011, after being regularly used in two Primeira Liga campaigns by the Students, Coelho signed a four-year deal with S.L. Benfica. In August, deemed surplus to requirements by manager Jorge Jesus, he was loaned to S.C. Beira-Mar, joining Super League Greece side Aris Thessaloniki F.C. in 2012 on yet another loan.

In the summer of 2013, Coelho was released by the Lisbon-based club and moved to F.C. Arouca, recently promoted to the top flight. He went on to be their first-choice holding midfielder for several years, as well as team captain.

International career
Coelho was capped for Portugal at under-19 level, appearing for the nation at the 2006 UEFA European Championship and the 2006 Lusofonia Games. The following year, he was picked for the squad that competed in the FIFA U-20 World Cup in Canada.

References

External links

1987 births
Living people
People from Covilhã
Sportspeople from Castelo Branco District
Portuguese footballers
Association football defenders
Association football midfielders
Association football utility players
Primeira Liga players
Liga Portugal 2 players
Segunda Divisão players
S.C. Covilhã players
FC Porto B players
FC Porto players
U.D. Leiria players
Portimonense S.C. players
Associação Académica de Coimbra – O.A.F. players
S.L. Benfica footballers
S.C. Beira-Mar players
F.C. Arouca players
Belenenses SAD players
G.D. Chaves players
Super League Greece players
Aris Thessaloniki F.C. players
Portugal youth international footballers
Portugal under-21 international footballers
Portuguese expatriate footballers
Expatriate footballers in Greece
Portuguese expatriate sportspeople in Greece